José Zamora Girona (born 20 August 1988) is a Spanish former footballer who played as a winger.

Club career
Zamora was born in Barcelona, Catalonia. After playing for two other clubs as a youth, he finished his development with another local side, RCD Espanyol, joining at the age of 12. He made his senior debut with their reserves, spending one and a half seasons in the Segunda División B.

Having been loaned to SD Eibar in February 2008, Zamora contributed one start as the Basque team retained their Segunda División status. In the summer, he signed with Real Madrid Castilla of the third division.

Zamora was loaned to SD Ponferradina for the 2009–10 campaign, being relatively used as the side returned to the second tier after a three-year absence. On 1 February 2011, he was loaned to Swedish Allsvenskan club Halmstads BK along with Castilla teammates Raúl and Javi Hernández. Aged only 23, he retired due to injuries, shortly after Castilla won promotion to division two as champions.

Honours
Real Madrid Castilla
Segunda División B: 2011–12

Spain U19
UEFA European Under-19 Championship: 2007

References

External links

1988 births
Living people
Spanish footballers
Footballers from Barcelona
Association football wingers
Segunda División players
Segunda División B players
RCD Espanyol B footballers
SD Eibar footballers
Real Madrid Castilla footballers
SD Ponferradina players
Allsvenskan players
Halmstads BK players
Spain youth international footballers
Spanish expatriate footballers
Expatriate footballers in Sweden
Spanish expatriate sportspeople in Sweden